The Lion King 2: the musical (Also called Return to Pride Rock: Songs Inspired by Disney's The Lion King II: Simba's Pride) is a 1998 studio album released as an accompaniment to the animated film The Lion King II: Simba's Pride. Although not promoted as an official soundtrack, it contains all the songs from the film, as well as additional songs by Lebo M. Other featured artists included Liz Callaway, Nick Glennie-Smith, Robert Guillaume, Ladysmith Black Mambazo, and Suzanne Pleshette.
On August 31, 2004, Disney released an "enhanced soundtrack" to coincide with the release of the film's 2-disc Special Edition DVD. However, the CD only contains the songs featured in the film, without any of the "inspired" songs from Return to Pride Rock.

Track listing

Awards 
Return to Pride Rock has been recognized by Billboard Albums on the Top Kid Audio and World Music charts.

References 

1998 albums
Disney albums
The Lion King (franchise)
World music albums
Works by Joss Whedon